Leonard Francis Carney  (30 May 1915 – March 1996) was an English professional footballer who played as an inside forward.

Career
Born in Liverpool, Carney played amateur football for Liverpool University, Northern Nomads, Marine and Collegiate Old Boys, before signing for Liverpool in 1939. After making 33 wartime appearances, Carney made his debut in the Football League on 31 August 1946, the opening day of the 1946–47 season. He made a further five league appearances for Liverpool before leaving the club in 1948.

Personal life
Carney served in the British Armed Forces during the Second World War. He was awarded the Distinguished Service Order for service in Italy.

References

1915 births
1996 deaths
English footballers
Association football forwards
English Football League players
Northern Nomads F.C. players
Marine F.C. players
Liverpool F.C. players